John Patrick Devereux (born May 20, 1963) is a retired American soccer midfielder/defender who played professionally for the Charleston Battery and overseas.

Devereux was born to a French mother and English father, Frederick Devereux, who was in the United States Air Force.  He attended Charleston Southern University.  After college, he played in Limoges, France before returning to the United States where he signed with the Charleston Battery for the 1993 USISL season.

Devereux has also coached soccer for a number of years at schools and for clubs including college and youth-teams in Mount Pleasant, South Carolina. He has two sons and one daughter. He currently lives in Hanahan, South Carolina, and coaches the Varsity Team at Hanahan High School as well.

References

1963 births
American expatriate soccer players
American soccer coaches
Association football midfielders
Charleston Battery players
Charleston Southern Buccaneers men's soccer players
Sportspeople from Dayton, Ohio
Soccer players from Ohio
USISL players
Living people
American soccer players
High school soccer coaches in the United States